Trị An Lake is an artificial lake located on the Dong Nai River, with the territory of Vĩnh Cửu, Định Quán, Thống Nhất and Trảng Bom districts, all in Đồng Nai province. It store, then supply water for Trị An Dam.

It has an area of 323 km2 and a capacity of 2.7 billion m3. In the north of the lake is Cát Tiên National Park. There are 76 small islands in the lake, some of which are inhabited. Today, it is also a picnic spot in Đồng Nai province.

References

Lakes of Vietnam
Geography of Đồng Nai province